The River Rhine forms a natural frontier and so the phrase Rhine Crossing, Crossing of the Rhine, or forcing the Rhine may refer to one of several crossings of it.

History 
the Crossing of the Rhine from east to west by barbarians in 406, into the territory of the Roman Empire
several times by French troops invading Germany during the Franco-Dutch War, such as:
12 June 1672 near Tolhuis, commanded by the Vicomte de Turenne and Louis, Prince of Condé, in which Louis was severely wounded forcing the river crossing – this crossing was commemorated in the painting Crossing of the Rhine by the army of Louis XIV, 1672 by Joseph Parrocel
1673, led by Turenne
from east to west by Charles Alexander of Lorraine in 1744 during the War of the Austrian Succession, as commemorated in Johann Tobias Sonntag's painting Duke of Lorraine crossing the Rhine before Strasbourg 
several times by French troops invading Germany during the French Revolutionary Wars:
for the first time in 1794, near Düsseldorf
on 6 September 1795, as commemorated in Louis-François Lejeune's painting First crossing of the Rhine by the French army commander by Jourdan and Kléber, at Düsseldorf in the duchy of Berg, 6 September 1795
18 April 1797, by French Revolutionary forces near Neuwied, causing to the Battle of Neuwied.
Between 27 April and 2 May 1800, 100,000 men under Jean Victor Marie Moreau, crossing to confront the Austrians, who they then met at the battle of Stockach.
from east to west by Prussian and Russian Troops invading France in 1814 near Kaub, as commemorated in Wilhelm Camphausen's painting General von Blücher Crossing the Rhine.

World War II 

The crossing from west to east by the western Allies in March 1945 during the Western Allied invasion of Germany.  
 Battle of Remagen - on 7 March by the First United States Army
 Nierstein Rhine crossing - on 22 March by the Third United States Army
 Operation Plunder and Operation Varsity – on 23-24 March. British units participating were granted the battle honour 'Rhine Crossing' by the British Army
 Boppard Rhine crossing - on 25-26 March by the Third United States Army, at Boppard and Sankt Goar
 Worms Rhine crossing - on 26 March by the Seventh United States Army

Rhine